Sant'Anatolia di Narco is a comune (municipality) in the Province of Perugia in the Italian region Umbria, located about 60 km southeast of Perugia, in the middle Valnerina valley. It is a medieval town commanded by a 12th-century castle, with a 14th-century line of walls.

History
Situated near the Nera river, the town has been inhabited since ancient times but owes its current appearance to the late medieval period.

The castle that dominates the town dates back to 1198, while the walls, with two 1400's towers, were built in 13th-14th century.

Main Sights

Church of Sant'Anatolia
The parish church of Sant'Anatolia contains valuable frescoes from the 14th century. Also of great artistic interest is the small Renaissance-style church of Santa Maria delle Grazie, which has recently been carefully restored.

Convent of Santa Croce

The convent of Santa Croce was built in the 13th century. The blessed Cristina, a Franciscan tertiary, lived there in the 14th century. Abandoned, it was rebuilt in 1610. It was under the patronage of the Lateran Basilica and was attributed to the Franciscan order.

Since 2008, Sant'Anatolia has been home to the Museo della Canapa, which is housed in the 16th-century town hall and is one of the branches of the Umbrian Apennine Ridge Eco-museum. It traces the development of hemp cultivation over the centuries in the middle Valnerina.

Abbey of San Felice and Mauro
In the hamlet of Castel San Felice stands the Abbey of San Felice and Mauro, dedicated to the two Syrian hermits who evangelized this area in the 5th century; the church was rebuilt in the 12th century. The abbey is located in the hamlet of Castel San Felice.

Transportation

Railway
From 1926 to 1968 Sant'Anatolia di Narco was served (via the station of the same name) by the Spoleto-Norcia railway, a narrow-gauge line connecting Spoleto with Norcia, which ran from 1 November 1926 to 31 July 1968, when it was closed down. The traces of the railway are almost all preserved, and the trackbed has been converted into a cycle path.

References

Sources

Cities and towns in Umbria